Snowball Game may refer to:

Snowball Game (1985), a contest held during the 1985 NFL season
Snowball Game (1995), a contest held during the 1995 NFL season